The ceremonial county of Somerset consists of a non-metropolitan county, administered by Somerset County Council, which is divided into five districts, and two unitary authorities. The districts of Somerset are West Somerset, South Somerset, Taunton Deane, Mendip and Sedgemoor. The two administratively independent unitary authorities, which were established on 1 April 1996 following the breakup of the county of Avon, are North Somerset and Bath and North East Somerset. These unitary authorities include areas that were once part of Somerset before the creation of Avon in 1974.

In the United Kingdom, the term listed building refers to a building or other structure officially designated as being of special architectural, historical, or cultural significance; Grade I structures are those considered to be "buildings of exceptional interest". Listing was begun by a provision in the Town and Country Planning Act 1947. Once listed, strict limitations are imposed on the modifications allowed to a building's structure or fittings. In England, the authority for listing under the Planning (Listed Buildings and Conservation Areas) Act 1990 rests with English Heritage, a non-departmental public body sponsored by the Department for Digital, Culture, Media and Sport; local authorities have a responsibility to regulate and enforce the planning regulations.

Grade II* structures are those considered to be "particularly significant buildings of more than local interest".

As there are 1073 Grade II* listed buildings in the county they have been split into separate lists for each district.

 Grade II* listed buildings in Bath and North East Somerset - 212 entries
 Grade II* listed buildings in Mendip - 210 entries
 Grade II* listed buildings in North Somerset - 79 entries
 Grade II* listed buildings in Sedgemoor - 88 entries
 Grade II* listed buildings in South Somerset - 266 entries
 Grade II* listed buildings in Taunton Deane - 118 entries
 Grade II* listed buildings in West Somerset - 100 entries

See also
 Grade I listed buildings in Somerset

References

 
Lists of Grade II* listed buildings in Somerset